Robert Henry Cobbold (1816, Eye, Suffolk - 1893 Hereford ) was an Anglican missionary who worked with William Russell at the Church Missionary Society in China in Ningbo, China.

He and Russell left for China in November 1847, arriving in Ningbo, where they started work with the assistance of Mary Ann Aldersey.

Several of his works were printed in Chinese:
 1856 Exhortations for the Age

References

1816 births
1893 deaths